Mechanics Cooperative Bank is a savings bank headquartered in Taunton, Massachusetts. The bank has 9 branches, 8 of which are in Bristol County, Massachusetts.

History
The bank was founded in 1877 as Mechanics' Co-operative Bank.

In 1986, the bank became insured by the Federal Deposit Insurance Corporation.

In 2007, the bank acquired Bridgewater Cooperative Bank.

In 2008, the bank acquired Lafayette Federal Savings Bank.

In 2011, the bank reorganized into a mutual organization.

In 2014, the bank changed its name to Mechanics Cooperative Bank.

References

1877 establishments in Massachusetts
Banks based in Massachusetts
Banks established in 1877
Taunton, Massachusetts